Dzhalil may refer to:

3082 Dzhalil, a main-belt asteroid
Dzhalil (urban-type settlement), an urban locality in Sarmanovsky District, Republic of Tatarstan, Russia
An alternate name for Cəlilli, Tovuz District, Azerbaijan

See also
Jalil (disambiguation)
Djalil (disambiguation)